Al-Karak, is a city in Jordan known for its medieval castle, the Kerak Castle. The castle is one of the three largest castles in the region, the other two being in Syria. Al-Karak is the capital city of the Karak Governorate.

Al-Karak has a view of the Dead Sea. A city of about 32,216 people (2005) has been built up around the castle and it has buildings from the 19th-century Ottoman period. The town is built on a triangular plateau, with the castle at its narrow southern tip.

History

Iron Age to Assyrian period
Al-Karak has been inhabited since at least the Iron Age, and was an important city for the Moabites. In the Bible it is called Qer Harreseth or Kir of Moab, and is identified as having been subject to the Neo-Assyrian Empire; in the Books of Kings and Book of Amos, it is mentioned as the place where the Arameans went before they settled in the regions in the northern Levant, and to which Tiglath-Pileser III (r. 745–727 BC) sent the prisoners after the conquest of Damascus. After the conquest of Damascus, for some number of years later the Shamaili kingdom seized power, but it is unsure for how long. Little has been recorded about their ruling period. In 1958 the remains of an inscription was found in Wadi al-Karak that has been dated to the late 9th century BC.

Hellenistic to Early Muslim period
During the late Hellenistic Period, Al-Karak became an important town taking its name from the Aramaic word for town, Kharkha.

The area eventually fell under the power of the Nabateans. The Roman Empire – with support from the Arab Ghassanid tribe, or Ghassasinah – conquered it from them in  AD105. The city was known in Late Antiquity as Harreketh.

Al-Karak contains some of the oldest Christian communities in the world, dating as early as the 1st century AD. Under the Byzantine Empire, Charach (Kharkh) or Charach of the Moabites (Kharakhmōba) was the seat of a bishopric, housing the much venerated Church of Nazareth, and remained predominantly Christian under Arab rule. Its bishop Demetrius took part in the council of the three provinces of Palaestina held in Jerusalem in 536. Another bishop, by the name of John, is said to have lived in the 9th century.

Crusader, Ayyubid and Mamluk periods

Al-Karak fell within the Crusader lordship of Oultrejourdain, the lands east of the River Jordan and the Dead Sea. In 1132, King Fulk of Jerusalem made Pagan the Butler Lord of Montreal and Oultrejourdain. Pagan made his headquarters at al-Karak, where he built a castle on a hill called by the Crusaders Petra Deserti - The Stone of the Desert. His castle, much modified, dominates the town to this day.

The castle was in Crusader hands for only 46 years. It had been threatened by Saladin's armies several times, but finally surrendered in 1188, after the crushing Crusader defeat at the Battle of Hattin and a siege that lasted more than a year. Saladin's younger brother, Al-Adil, was governor of the district until becoming ruler of Egypt and Syria in 1199. Yaqut (1179–1229) noted that "Al Karak is a very strongly fortified castle on the borders of Syria, towards Balka province, and in the mountains. It stands on a rock surrounded by Wadis, except on the side towards the suburb." Al-Dimashqi (1256–1327) noted that Karak: "is an impregnable fortress, standing high on the summit of a mountain. Its fosses are the valleys around it, which are very deep. They say it was originally, in Roman days, a convent, and was turned into a fortress. It is now a treasure house of the Turks." Abu'l-Fida (1273−1331) noted that Al Karak "is a celebrated town with a very high fortress, one of the most unassailable of the fortresses of Syria. About a day's march from it is Mutah, where are the tombs of Ja'afar at Tayyar and his companions. Below Al Karak is a valley, in which is a thermal bath (hammam), and many gardens with excellent fruits, such as apricots, pears, pomegranates, and others."

Al-Karak was the birthplace of Ibn al-Quff (1233–1286), an Arab Christian physician and surgeon, author of the earliest medieval Arabic treatise intended solely for surgeons.

In 1355, Ibn Battuta visited and wrote: "Al Karak is one of the strongest and most celebrated fortresses of Syria. It is called also Hisn al Ghurab (the Crow's Fortress), and is surrounded on every side by ravines. There is only one gateway, and that enters by a passage tunnelled in the live rock, which tunnel forms a sort of hall. We stayed four days outside Karak, at a place called Ath Thaniyyah.

The castle played an important role as a place of exile and a power base several times during the Mamluk sultanate. Its significance lay in its control over the caravan route between Damascus and Egypt and the pilgrimage route between Damascus and Mecca. In the thirteenth century, the Mamluk ruler Baibars used it as a stepping stone on his ascent to power. In 1389 Sultan Barquq was exiled to al-Karak, where he gathered his supporters before returning to Cairo.

Ottoman period

In 1596 Al-Karak appeared in the Ottoman tax registers, situated in the nahiya (subdistrict) of Karak, part of the Sanjak of Ajlun. It had 78 households and 2 bachelors who were Muslim, and 103 households and 8 bachelors who were Christian. They paid a fixed tax-rate of 25% on agricultural products, including wheat, barley, olive trees/vineyards/fruit trees, a special product (bayt al–mal), goats and bee-hives; in addition to occasional revenues, for a water mill, and a market toll. Their total tax was 15,000 akçe.

Al-Karak is dominated by the Al Majali tribe, the Tarawneh tribe and the Maaitah tribe. The Ghassanid tribe is believed to be the first to inhabit the site of modern al-Karak. The tribe consists of the families: Suheimat, Halasa{Halaseh}, Dmour, Mbaydeen, Adaileh, Soub, and Mdanat and Karakiyeen.

In 1844 Ibrahim Pasha of Egypt sent an expedition west of the Dead Sea. His troops occupied the castle at al-Karak but they were starved out with much loss of life.

Mohammed Al-Majali who had control of Al-Karak in 1868, was involved in the events that led to the destruction of the Moabite Stone.

In 1893 the Sublime Porte Abdul Hamid II established the sub-province of Ma'an, with a resident governor (mutasarif) in Al-Karak, under the Wāli of Syria based in Damascus. One of the first governors, 1895, was Hussein Helmy Bey Effendi (see also Hüseyin Hilmi Pasha), aged 40, formerly the General Secretary at Damascus. He ruled with a garrison of 1,200 troops, in 3 regiments, mostly conscripts from West of the River Jordan doing their three years of military service. There were also 200 Circassian cavalry. One of his achievements was the disarming of the local population. He also established a Military Hospital with a Jewish doctor; enforced the regulation of coinage and weights and measures; introduced a weekly postal service to Jerusalem, Damascus and Ma'an; and set up agricultural projects such as the planting of 5,000 grape vines at Madeba.

One estimate of the population of the town and the surrounding area at this time gives a total of 10,000. Of these, 8000 were Muslims and 2,000 were Orthodox Christians whose Church, St George, had been built in 1849. The Latin Mission was established in 1874 and in 1886 Al Majali gave permission to the English Mission to work in the town. The town's Orthodox school had 120 boys and 60 girls. The same source notes that the town's Mufti had been educated in Hebron and al Azhar, Cairo, and that there was a newly built mosque. Merchants from Damascus came to the town twice each year.

Karak revolt and Arab Revolt
The Karak revolt erupted on 4 December 1910 as the governor of Damascus attempted to apply the same measures of conscription, taxation, and disarmament to the inhabitants of Al-Karak that previously provoked the Hauran Druze Rebellion. The uprising ended with an indiscriminate massacre perpetrated by the governor's troops.

During the Arab Revolt (1916–1918), the Turkish Army abandoned al-Karak after Sherif Abdullah ibn Hamza led a 70 horsemen attack on Mezraa. This Ottoman naval base was rendered useless, after the destruction of the flotilla used to transport grain across the Dead Sea, on 28 Jan. 1918.

British Mandate, Emirate of Transjordan
Following the San Remo conference, 1920, Great Britain was given a mandate to govern the area. The newly appointed High Commissioner in Jerusalem, Herbert Samuel, sent several officials east of the River Jordan to create a local administration. Major Alec Kirkbride was based in Al-Karak with a small detachment of policemen. He established what he named The National Government of Moab with himself as president. In January 1921 Emir Abdullah Hussein began assembling an army in Ma'an and announced his intention to attack the French in Syria. After a brief consultation with his superiors Kirkbride's government welcomed the arrival of the Emir. At the Cairo conference, March 1921, Abdullah was recognised by the British as ruler of Emirate of Transjordan.

In the 1920s, Al-Karak had a population of 8,000 and had the third largest urban population (after Amman and Salt with 20,000 each) in Transjordan.

Kingdom of Jordan
In 1961, the population of Karak town was 7,422 persons, of whom 1,622 where Christian.

In August 1996, there were food riots in the town after the government increased the price of bread.

The town and castle were the scene of an attack by gunmen on 18 December 2016 in which at least 19 people were killed; 13 Jordanian civilians and security forces, a Canadian tourist, and all 5 attackers.

Climate
Al-Karak has a hot-summer Mediterranean climate (Köppen climate classification Csa). Most rain falls in the winter. About  of precipitation falls annually.

Demographics
Al-Karak's metropolitan population was estimated to be 68,800 in 2013, making up 31.5% of the total population of the Karak Governorate. Most of the population of the city is Muslim (75%) and there is also a significant Christian population (25%). In general, the percentage of Christians in al-Karak is among the highest in Jordan.

Cuisine
Al-Karak is famous for its traditional Jordanian lamb dish called mansaf.

Gallery

Twin towns – sister cities
 Birmingham, Alabama, United States

Notable people
Muath al-Kasasbeh, Royal Jordanian Air Force pilot captured, held hostage, and burned alive in Syria in January 2015 by the Islamic State of Iraq and the Levant

See also
 Jordan River
 Madaba

References

Bibliography

 
 

 

 
 (pp. 361, 444, 456)

 (pp. 286−295)
 (pp. 59− 60)

 (pp. 368 ff)

External links

 Al Karak.net, A website dedicated to Karak
Al-Karak and Crusader castle
Photos of Al-Karak from the American Center of Research

Archaeological sites in Jordan
Moab
Populated places in Karak Governorate
Populated places along the Silk Road